Todd Talbot (born June 12, 1973) is a Canadian actor and television personality. He is best known for his work as one of the co-hosts of Love it or List it Vancouver (Love it or List it Too in the U.S.) which airs on the W Network in Canada and HGTV in the U.S. Talbot also played the role of Matt Walker in the Canadian/American teen drama Hillside.

Career 

Born in Vancouver, Talbot began his acting career cast alongside fellow Canadian Ryan Reynolds in the Canadian TV series Hillside from 1991 to 1993 Which aired on Nickelodeon and YTV.  He then traveled to England to study acting, singing and dancing. Talbot has a passion for live theater and has performed all over the world. He returned to Television and Films and was cast in various roles until he signed on to co-host Love it or List it Vancouver in 2013. Since March 2007, he has been married to international singer and model Rebecca Talbot, with whom he has a son and a daughter.

2013-presents: Love it or List it Vancouver
Talbot and Jillian Harris were both signed as co-hosts of Love it or List it Vancouver. The series debuted in January 2013. He also contributes online blogs to the W Network. Talbot has also made appearances on local and national news and daytime talk show including Breakfast Television, Global News Morning, The Morning Show, CTV Morning Live and The Marilyn Denis Show.

Filmography

References

External links 
 Official Site
 HGTV Biography
 

Love It or List It
1973 births
Living people
Canadian male television actors
Canadian real estate agents
Canadian television hosts
Male actors from Vancouver